Cisiane Dutra Lopes (born 17 February 1983 in Jaboatão dos Guararapes, Pernambuco) is a female racewalker from Brazil. She competed in the 2007, 2011 and 2015 Pan American Games in Brazil, the Pan American Race Walking Cup, the 2008 World Cup of Athletics and in the 2015 World Championships. She also competed in the 2016 Olympic Games coming in at 49th.  She was the bronze medalist at the 2008 Ibero-American Championships in Athletics.  She was the 2004 South American Under-23 Championships in Athletics Champion.

She is a five time Brazilian National Champion, 2003, twice in 2006, 2007 and 2008.

External links

References

Living people
1983 births
Brazilian female racewalkers
Athletes (track and field) at the 2007 Pan American Games
Athletes (track and field) at the 2011 Pan American Games
Athletes (track and field) at the 2016 Summer Olympics
Pan American Games athletes for Brazil
People from Jaboatão dos Guararapes
Sportspeople from Pernambuco
20th-century Brazilian women
21st-century Brazilian women